Gormi is a block and a nagar panchayat in Bhind district in the Indian state of Madhya Pradesh.

Demographics
 India census, Gormi had a population of 17,255. Males constitute 54% of the population and females 46%. Gormi has an average literacy rate of 62%, higher than the national average of 59.5%: male literacy is 72%, and female literacy is 50%. In Gormi, 17% of the population is under 6 years of age.
There is a temple of Lord Hanuman near Dixit Market. Gormi is known as the worship place of Gautam rishi.

Temples
 Mahadev mandir at Seupura 
 Dhurkot the Hanuman temple
 Rangeshwar Mahadev Mandir
 Mahadev Mandir In Purani Basti
 Jain Mandir 
 Ancient temple of Gautam Rishi
 Khedapati Hanuman Mandir Mehdoli
 Chinta Haran Hanuman Mandir

Education
 Shri Ramnath Singh Mahavidyalaya Pharmacy, Gormi is affiliated to Rajiv Gandhi Proudyogiki Vishwavidyalaya (RGPV), Bhopal
 Shri Ramnath Singh Homeopathic Medical College and Hospital, Gormi
 Shri Gokul Singh parmar Shiksha Prasar samiti gormi
 Sanskar Shiksha Academy CBSE
 Sanskar ITI College
 Sanskar institute of vedic science
 Saraswati Shishu Vidya Mandir 
 Government Higher Secondary School
 Guljhari lal high school
 patel collage gormi
 Kalyani Convent school Gormi

References

Cities and towns in Bhind district